Punnai Nagar is a small residential area in Nagercoil, Tamil Nadu, India.
Konam Polytechnic is situated next to Punnai Nagar.
Many of the government quarters are situated around Punnai Nager and the Konam area. 

Punnai Nagar is within the Kottar Vicariate of the Kottar Diocese, served by the Church of Our Lady of Lourdes.

References 
 

Cities and towns in Kanyakumari district